The Tiroler Volkspartei (English: Tyrolean People's Party) is the Tirol branch of the Austrian People's Party.

The party was formed through a merger of the rival Christian Social Party and the Catholic Conservatives on October 27, 1918. After winning the first provincial legislative election in 1919, the Tiroler Volkspartei remained the most powerful party until the end of the First Austrian Republic. Within the party, the Tiroler Bauernbund (Farmers league) formed the largest and most influential group.

In the area of South Tyrol, which had been annexed to Italy, the Tiroler Volkspartei joined in a coalition with the Deutschfreiheitliche Partei called the Deutscher Verband. This coalition won 90% of the vote and sent four representatives to the Chamber of Deputies. However, the party lost its influence after the March on Rome in October 1922.

After 1945, the Tiroler Volkspartei became the state organization of the Austrian People's Party. It has remained the majority party in the provincial Landtag ever since, except for the years 1999 to 2008.

References

External links
 Official website

Defunct political parties in South Tyrol
Political parties in Austria-Hungary
Political parties established in 1918
Political parties in Austria
Catholic political parties
Conservative parties in Austria
Tyrol (state)